Zhityovo is a rural locality (a village) and the administrative center of Zhityovskoye Rural Settlement, Syamzhensky District, Vologda Oblast, Russia. The population was 316 as of 2002. There are 8 streets.

Geography 
Zhityovo is located 21 km south of Syamzha (the district's administrative centre) by road. Davydkovo is the nearest rural locality.

References 

Rural localities in Syamzhensky District